Australosomus is an extinct genus of prehistoric ray-finned fish that lived during the Early Triassic epoch.

The interlocking scales (3 to 4 times long as wide), deeply forked caudal fin all help to distinguish this genus, which is known from Triassic rocks in Greenland, Africa, Madagascar, British Columbia and Vancouver.

Australosomus is one of many genera to arise after the Permian extinction, only to die out during the Early Triassic, possibly during a subsequent extinction event.

See also

 Prehistoric fish
 List of prehistoric bony fish

References

Pholidopleuriformes
Prehistoric ray-finned fish genera
Early Triassic fish
Triassic bony fish
Prehistoric fish of Africa
Triassic fish of North America